Portland Pythons are a defunct indoor soccer team that played in the Premier Soccer Alliance (PSA) in 1998 which changed its name to the World Indoor Soccer League (WISL) in 1999.  The team folded at the end of the 1999 season.

History
In 1997, the Continental Indoor Soccer League (CISL) folded after five seasons.  The CISL had been founded as a summer indoor soccer league in 1993.  Although it had experienced some success in its early years, it barely made it through the 1997 season before folding.  The Portland Pride was a charter member of the CISL and with the collapse of the league, the team’s ownership, Portland Professional Soccer, LLC, joined with several other CISL teams to form the Premier Soccer Alliance (PSA).  With the new league came a new name as the Pride adopted the name Portland Pythons.

The Pythons performed poorly in the PSA’s first season.  The team went 1–6 and failed to make the playoffs.  At the end of the season, the PSA expanded into two new cities, but after a merger with the English Indoor Football League failed to materialize, the PSA renamed itself the World Indoor Soccer League (WISL).

The Pythons competed in the WISL in 1999, but folded at the end of the season after rumours of a move to Tacoma, Washington fell through.

Arena
While the Pride had played in Memorial Coliseum, the Pythons held their home games in the Rose Garden Arena.

Coach
 Ralph Black 1998–1999

Year-by-year

Honors
Goalkeeper of the Year
 1999  Brett Phillips

First Team All PSA
 1998  Jeff Betts, Billy Crook

First Team All WISL
 1999 Brett Phillips

External links
 Profile
 PSA season results

Pythons
Defunct soccer clubs in Oregon
World Indoor Soccer League teams
Defunct indoor soccer clubs in the United States
Premier Soccer Alliance teams
1998 establishments in Oregon
Soccer clubs in Oregon
1999 disestablishments in Oregon
Association football clubs established in 1998
Association football clubs disestablished in 1999